Deh-e Nezam (also Romanized as Deh-e Neẓām; also known as Dehneẓām) is a village in Esfandaqeh Rural District, in the Central District of Jiroft County, Kerman Province, Iran. At the 2006 census, its population was 29, in 8 families.

References 

Populated places in Jiroft County